Hilário Paulino Neves Freitas Leal (born 15 May 1974), simply known as Hilário, is a Portuguese retired footballer who played as a right back.

Football career
Hilário was born to Portuguese parents in Ajaccio, Corsica, France, returning to his motherland still as an infant. He made his professional debuts with local S.C. Freamunde, playing third division football with the club. In 1996, he moved straight into the top level with G.D. Chaves, appearing regularly in two of his three seasons and being relegated in his last, although he had already signed in January 1999 for A.C. Perugia in Italy.

With the Umbrians Hilário played in the 1999 UEFA Intertoto Cup, with his team being eliminated by Trabzonspor in the third round. He only appeared regularly in his first full season in Serie A (20 games), helping the side to a final midtable position and sharing teams with the likes of Hidetoshi Nakata, Alessandro Calori, Giovanni Tedesco, Massimiliano Esposito and Milan Rapaić; he never scored a goal for the club, but netted one in his own net against Inter Milan on 6 January 2000.

In 2002 Hilário moved back to Portugal, playing for F.C. Maia in division two before returning to Italy a year later, representing S.S. Sambenedettese Calcio in two Serie C seasons. Again in his country at the age of 31, he signed for F.C. Famalicão, switching in 2007 to Santa Maria F.C. in amateur football (fourth division).

In 2012 Hilário returned to Freamunde, being appointed its director of football.

See also
List of foreign Serie A players

References

External links

1974 births
Living people
Sportspeople from Ajaccio
Portuguese footballers
Association football defenders
Primeira Liga players
Liga Portugal 2 players
Segunda Divisão players
S.C. Freamunde players
G.D. Chaves players
F.C. Maia players
F.C. Famalicão players
Santa Maria F.C. players
Serie A players
A.C. Perugia Calcio players
A.S. Sambenedettese players
Portuguese expatriate footballers
Expatriate footballers in Italy
Portuguese expatriate sportspeople in Italy
Footballers from Corsica